is a national park in the western part of the island of Hokkaidō, Japan. Named after the volcanic caldera lakes of Lake Shikotsu and Lake Tōya, it has a total area of 993.02 square kilometers. The popular hot spring resort of Noboribetsu is also within the park.

The park can be divided into roughly five areas:
 The Mount Yōtei area
 The area around Lake Tōya, Mount Usu and Shōwa-shinzan (Tōya Caldera and Usu Volcano Geopark)

Image gallery

External links
 
 
 Shikotsu-Toya National Park Biodiversity Center of Japan
 Tōya Usu Geopark (English, Japanese)

 
National parks of Japan
Parks and gardens in Hokkaido
Protected areas established in 1949